Riós is a municipality in the Spanish province of Ourense, in the autonomous community of Galicia. It has a population of 2032 (Spanish 2006 Census) and an area of 114 km².

See also
Veiga do Seixo

Bibliography
 Xosé Lois Foxo. Cancioneiro das Terras do Riós, Vol. I. Diputación Provincial de Ourense, 2007.
 R. Otero Pedrayo, Historia de Galiza, Ed. Nos, 1962
 Xerardo Dasairas Valsa. Crónicas rexiomontanas, Mancomunidade de Concellos da Comarca de Monterrei, 1999
  Xerardo Dasairas Valsa. O Entroido en Terras de Monterrrei. Edicións do Cumio, 1990. 
 Pedro González de Ulloa. Descripción de los Estados de la Casa de Monterrey en Galicia (1777). CEG, anexo IV 1950
 Fernando Cabeza Quiles. Os Nomes de Lugar. Ed. Xerais, 1992

References
 Riós photos: http://www.pueblos-espana.org/galicia/orense/rios/
 Castrelo de Cima page: http://castrelos.blogia.com/
 Castrelo de Abaixo photos: http://castrelodeabaixo.blogspot.com/

Municipalities in the Province of Ourense